The 14th constituency of the Nord is a French legislative constituency in the Nord département.

Description

Nord's 14th constituency entirely surrounds Nord's 13th constituency and includes the eastern half of Dunkerque along with most of the coastal strip along the English Channel of the department.

Despite being held by the French Communist Party between 1962 and 1986 the seat has since then been held mostly by conservatives.

Historic Representation

Election results

2022

 
 
 
 
 
 
 
|-
| colspan="8" bgcolor="#E9E9E9"|
|-

2017

2012

 
 
 
 
|-
| colspan="8" bgcolor="#E9E9E9"|
|-

2007

 
 
 
 
 
 
 
 
|-
| colspan="8" bgcolor="#E9E9E9"|
|-

2002

 
 
 
 
|-
| colspan="8" bgcolor="#E9E9E9"|
|-

1997

 
 
 
 
 
 
|-
| colspan="8" bgcolor="#E9E9E9"|
|-

Sources
 Official results of French elections from 1998: 

14